Looking Through You is the debut album by British pop band The Yeah You's, released by Island Records on 28 September 2009.

Looking Through You has already spawned two singles, the first "15 Minutes" and the second single "Getting Up With You" which was released on 14 September 2009.

Track listing

References

2009 debut albums
Albums produced by Mike Kintish